Events in the year 2018 in Russia.

Incumbents
President: Vladimir Putin
Prime Minister: Dmitry Medvedev

Events

February
 11 February – Saratov Airlines Flight 703 crashed shortly after take-off, killing all 71 people on board.

March
 15–17 March  –  Sergey Lavrov has announced that Russia will expel diplomats from the United Kingdom because of the expulsion of 23 Russian envoys due to the poisoning of Sergei Skripal and Yulia Skripal. The Russian foreign ministry is to expel 23 British diplomats amid tensions over the nerve agent attack in the United Kingdom.
 18 March – In the Russian presidential election, Vladimir Putin is elected for a fourth term, winning 73.9% of the vote.
 25 March - 2018 Kemerovo fire

May

 5 May – Thousand Protest rally in 97 cities including Moscow and St Petersburg, against Vladimir Putin for winning a fourth term in the Russian President Election.
 7 May - Vladimir Putin sworn in for a fourth term as President of Russia in the Hall of the Order of St. Andrew of the Grand Kremlin Palace.
 10 May - Opening of Crimean Bridge.

June

 14 June – The opening ceremonies of the 2018 FIFA World Cup.
 19 June – the Russian State Duma adopted a bill that made education in all languages but Russian optional, overruling previous laws by ethnic autonomies, and reducing instruction in minority languages to only two hours a week. This bill has been likened by some commentators, such as in Foreign Affairs, to a policy of Russification.

July
 1 July – Several thousand people protested across Russia against a hugely unpopular government decision to hike the pension age that has led to a record slump in President Vladimir Putin's approval ratings. No protests were held in World Cup host cities due to a regulation banning protest in the cities for the duration of the tournament.
 Russia knocks out Spain from the World Cup after winning a penalty shootout.
 15 July - Closing ceremony of  2018 FIFA World Cup
 28 July – More than 10,000 people attended a rally in the capital, Moscow against government plans to increase the retirement age rise.

August
 2 August – More than 9,000 people attended a rally against government plans to increase the retirement age rise.

September 

 11 September - Pussy Riot's manager Pyotr Verzilov mysteriously fell critically ill after a court hearing in Moscow. This was the same day that he was slated to have received vital information from 'foreign services' about the death of several journalists reporting on the Wagner Battalion's actions in the Central African Republic.
11 September - Then Russian Minister of Justice Alexander Konovalov announced an expansion on 'extremist' materials, including the addition of 4,507 books, videos, websites, social media pages, and musical compositions. This was recorded to be a seismic, 200 item increase from the prior year.

October 

 26 October - Marking the first of approximately 36 public, Hip-Hop concerts, a three-month period of cancelled performances would begin. Dmitry Kuznetsov, or Husky, had his concert in Togliatti cancelled following a letter from the Prosecutor's office rejecting some of the lyrics of songs that were to be performed that evening due to the presence of 'cannibalism.'

December

 26–28 December – The 2018 World Rapid Chess Championship was held in Saint Petersburg. Winner and world champion was Daniil Dubov from Russia, ahead of Shakhriyar Mamedyarov and Hikaru Nakamura.

Deaths

January

3 January – Igor Strelbin, footballer (b. 1974).
9 January – Robert Minlos, mathematician (b. 1931)
9 January – Alexander Vedernikov, singer and teacher (b. 1927)
9 January – Valeri Matyunin, footballer (b. 1960)
10 January – Mikhail Derzhavin, actor (b. 1936)
15 January – Viktor Anpilov, politician and trade unionist (b. 1945)
25 January – Lyudmila Senchina, soprano singer (b. 1948 or 1950)

February

21 February – Valentin Afraimovich, mathematician (b.1945) 
21 February – Sergei Aleksandrov, footballer (b. 1973)
26 February – Tatyana Karpova, actress (b. 1916)

March

22 March – Khozh-Akhmed Bersanov, Chechen writer and ethnographer (b. 1926)
26 March – Sergei Mavrodi, financial fraudster and a deputy of the State Duma (b. 1955)
27 March – Victor Kalashnikov, gun designer (b. 1942)
28 March – Oleg Anofriyev, actor, singer, songwriter, film director and poet (b. 1930)

April

16 April – Maxim Borodin, 32, Russian Journalist (b. 1986)
19 April – Vladimir Lyakhov, cosmonaut (b. 1941)
21 April – Nina Doroshina, actress (b. 1934)
22 April – Ivan P. Neumyvakin, physician (b. 1928)

May

21 May – Aleksandr Askoldov, actor and film director (b. 1932)

July

3 July – Boris Orlov, gymnastics coach (b. 1945).
5 July – Evgeny Golod, mathematician who proved the Golod–Shafarevich theorem on class field towers (b. 1935).
8 July – Tazir Kariyev, footballer (b. 1989).
10 July – Andrei Suslin, mathematician who contributed to algebraic K-theory and its connections with algebraic geometry (b. 1950).
27 July – Vladimir Voinovich, writer (b. 1932).

See also 
 2017 in Russia
 2019 in Russia
 21st century
 Elections in Russia
 Russian Activities and Intentions in Recent Elections

References

 
2010s in Russia
Years of the 21st century in Russia
Russia
Russia
Russia